The Party of the South (PdS) is a political party in Italy founded in 2007 by Antonio Ciano. The political action of the party is inspired by Guido Dorso.

In the general election of April 2008, the party ran only for the Senate and received 3,736 votes (0.01%).

During the national congress in Naples on 25 September 2010, Beppe De Santis was named new secretary of the party.

For the general elections of April 2013, the party presented its lists in Lazio and nominated some of its members in the Civil Revolution list in the region of northern Italy.

During the 4th national congress of the party, that took place in April 2013, Natale Cuccurese was named new President of the party.

On the occasion of the 2022 general elections, the PdS joined to the People's Union list, led by Luigi de Magistris, while Natale Cuccurese, party leader and municipal councilor in Quattro Castella, is a candidate for the Chamber of Deputies in Emilia-Romagna.

References

External links
Official website

2007 establishments in Italy
Left-wing nationalist parties
Political parties established in 2007
Regionalist parties in Italy
Socialist parties in Italy